The Van Leer Jerusalem Institute (VLJI) is a center for the interdisciplinary study and discussion of issues related to philosophy, society, culture, and education. The Institute was established in to create a body of knowledge and discourseto give expression to the wide range of disciplines and opinions in Israel. The contribution of a core of renowned scholars facilitates the implementation of reforms and new approaches in various social spheres.

The Institute is located in Jerusalem's Talbiya neighborhood, next door to the official residence of the President of Israel. Its campus also houses the Israel Academy of Sciences and Humanities and the Council for Higher Education.

History
The Van Leer Institute was established in 1959 by the European branch of the Van Leer family from Netherlands. The stated goals of the institute are to "advance knowledge in the realms of philosophy, society, and culture", to enhance ethnic and cultural understanding, ease social tensions and promote democratic values through academic research, public policy analysis, advocacy and civil society projects. The institute organizes domestic and international conferences, symposia and workshops, and publishes books and periodicals.

Van Leer organizes domestic and international conferences, symposia and workshops, publishes periodicals, books and monographs, and promotes pluralistic public dialogue. It houses a 27,000-volume library devoted to philosophy, philosophy of science, historical sociology and political theory.
According to Ofira Seliktar, a scholar specializing in anti-Israeli activities of Israeli scholars, it was used to give a measure of respectability to Post-Zionist scholars.

Activities 
The Institute is active in four main areas: Advanced Studies, Jewish Culture and Thinking, Israeli Civil Society, and Mediterranean Neighbours. A variety of methods and approaches are employed in each of these areas with projects, discussion groups, and collaborations with academic institutions, civil society organizations, and government bodies. Activities include conducting studies of public policy and applied social research, developing and running educational programs as well as training programs for educators and community leaders, hosting cultural activities for the general public, and publishing books, anthologies, and journals. The Institute cooperates with a large number of Israeli and international research institutions and conducts joint projects with visiting scholars from around the world. The campus houses two libraries and a variety of different sized halls which host conferences and events.

According to Daniel Gutwein the institute used to popularize post-Zionist ideas.

Advanced Studies 
The Advanced Studies Unit is headed by Dr. Yochi Fischer and is committed to multidisciplinary and comparative research in the fields of humanities and social sciences.

Activities include research groups, workshops, international conferences, and a summer seminar with participants comprising senior scholars in Israel, their international colleagues, and young scholars and intellectuals.

The unit focuses on issues of religion, secularism, and democracy; equality, pluralism, and racism; the state of higher education, especially in the humanities; and issues of history, memory, and reconciliation from a comparative and interdisciplinary perspective.

The Polonsky Academy for Advanced Study in the Humanities and Social Sciences 
The Polonsky Academy, spearheaded by Dr. Leonard Polonsky and inaugurated in 2014, is an international center for humanities and social sciences that supports young international and Israeli scholars. The Polonsky Program provides these scholars with facilities and full financial support for up to five years to enable them to further their research and better prepare them for their future academic careers.

Mediterranean Neighbours 
VLJI has established the academic discipline of Mediterranean studies which focuses on the study of cultures and societies of countries in the region. This decision was based, inter alia, on the 1995 Barcelona Declaration and on the establishment of the Euro-Mediterranean Partnership which redefined the idea of the Mediterranean and cooperation in the Mediterranean basin as an economic, political, and cultural plan of action.

The Mediterranean Neighbours Unit, is headed by Dr. Abigail Jacobson. It was established to promote the study of the region, to influence the way in which the region is portrayed and understood, and to encourage understanding and dialogue between Israelis and their neighbours. Israeli and Palestinian scholars lead pioneering studies and cross-border projects including academic discussion groups, workshops, conferences, and publications.

Specific areas of activity include research, the Journal of Levantine Studies, regional dialogue, and involvement in the Anna Lindh Foundation.

Manarat: The Van Leer Center for Jewish-Arab Relations
The Manarat Center, headed by Dr. Yonatan Mendel, was established in 2015 to highlight a variety of issues, including the status and rights of Palestinian citizens of Israel, the ramifications of the protracted Israeli-Arab conflict for both Jewish and Arab societies, and Israel's place in the Middle East. The center is involved in research and discourse regarding the challenges facing Israeli and Palestinian society in an attempt to discover the methods and principles likely to promote understanding, a shared life, mutual respect, reconciliation, justice, and peace. The Manarat Center, aims to promote partnerships between Jewish and Arab organizations.

The Center for the Study of Arab Society in Israel

Jewish Culture and Thinking
VLJI's Jewish Culture and Thinking Program is headed by Prof. Amnon Raz-Krakotzkin and promotes interdisciplinary research and public events concerning Jewish culture and thought in Israel and the Diaspora. The programs focus on the identity of communities, the streams and phenomena of contemporary Judaism, Judaism and democracy, and expressions of Jewish culture, thought, and creativity. The Jewish Culture and Thinking Program is a home for both established and young scholars in the humanities and social sciences, as well as thinkers, rabbis, and educators from Israel and abroad.

Israeli Civil Society
The Israeli Civil Society Unit, headed by Prof. Moshe Justman, focuses on creating a body of knowledge on citizenship and civic policy to be incorporated in public discourse and used by decision-makers. Projects — including research groups, discussion groups, round-tables on key current issues relating to social change, local and international conferences, and public symposiums — are thematically clustered around the basic issues of citizenship, social justice, relations between the state and civil society, Arab society in Israel, gender, economics, and education.

Public events
VLJI hosts an array of public events comprising conferences, workshops, colloquia, symposia, and other public meetings. The wide range of participants include intellectuals from Israeli and international academia and from the worlds of journalism, public policy, and politics.

Leadership 
The Head of the Van Leer Jerusalem Institute is Prof. Shai Lavi, a Tel Aviv University law professor who specializes in sociology and philosophy of law. He is currently also the director of the Edmond J. Safra Center for Ethics and the co-director of the Minerva Center for the Interdisciplinary Study of the End of Life, both at Tel Aviv University.

The academic committee is composed of Prof. Moshe Justman, director of the Israel Civil Society Unit and economics professor at Ben-Gurion University of the Negev; Dr. Abigail Jacobson, director of the Mediterranean Neighbours Unit; Dr. Yochi Fischer, director of the Advanced Studies Unit and history lecturer at the Hebrew University of Jerusalem; and Prof. Amnon (Nono) Raz-Krakotzkin, director of the Jewish Culture and Thinking Unit and currently chair of the Department of Jewish History at Ben-Gurion University of the Negev.

Past Directors 
2007-2016 – Gabriel Motzkin

1997-2007 – Shimshon Zelniker

1994-1997 – Nehemia Levtzion

1968-1993 – Yehuda Elkana

Notable scholars and fellows
 Azmi Bishara
 S. N. Eisenstadt
 Rachel Elior
 Menachem Friedman
 Ruth Gavison
 Naomi Hazan
 Hanna Herzog
 Avishai Margalit
 Paul Mendes-Flohr
 Adi Ophir
 Naftali Rothenberg
 Yehouda Shenhav

Selected publications
The Institute publishes books, anthologies, monographs, position papers, and journals.
 Privatization Policy in Israel: State Responsibility and the Boundaries between the Public and the Private (2015), eds. Itzhak Galnoor, Amir Paz-Fuchs, and Nomika Zion. Published in cooperation with Hakibbutz Hameuchad Publishing House, Tel Aviv.
 Captives (2014), ed. Merav Mack. Published in cooperation with the Zalman Shazar Center.
 Literature and Class: Towards a Political Historiography of Modern Hebrew Literature (2014), eds. Hannan Hever and Amir Banbaji. Published in cooperation with Hakibbutz Hameuchad Publishing House, Tel Aviv.
 Reform Judaism: Thought, Culture and Sociology (2014), ed. Avinoam Rosenak. Published in cooperation with Hakibbutz Hameuchad Publishing House, Tel Aviv.
 Educational Accountability: Between Consolidation and Dissolution, Adam Nir. Published in cooperation with Hakibbutz Hameuchad Publishing House, Tel Aviv.
 Values and Citizens: Civics Education through Active Learning for Middle Schools (2014), ed. Naftali Rothenberg. Published with Reches Educational Projects LTD.
 Theseus's Paradox: Gender, Religion and State (2014), eds. Hanna Herzog and Anat Lapidot-Firilla. Published in cooperation with Hakibbutz Hameuchad Publishing House, Tel Aviv.
 The Gender Index: Gender Inequality in Israel 2014, Hagar Tzameret-Kertcher.
 Post-Subjectivity (2014), eds. Christoph Schmidt, Merav Mack, and Andy R. German. Published in cooperation with Cambridge Scholars Publishing.
 Marking Evil: Holocaust Memory in the Global Age (2015), eds. Amos Goldberg and Haim Hazan. Published in cooperation with Berghahn Books.
 The Legacy of Polish Solidarity: Social Activism, Regime Collapse, and Building of a New Society (2015), eds. Andrzej Rychard and Gabriel Motzkin; published in cooperation with Peter Lang Publishers
Science in Context Cambridge University Press in cooperation with Tel Aviv University
The Politics of Humanitarianism in the Occupied Palestinian Territories Conference Proceedings (CD)(2005)
Men and Women: Gender, Judaism and Democracy edited by Rachel Elior (2004)
Collective Identities, Public Spheres and Political Order in Modern and Contemporary Scenes Tal Kohavi, Julia Lerner, Ronna Brayer-Garb (2003)
Women in Conflict Zones: Struggling With Ethno-National and Racial Conflicts Maya Kahanoff (2003)
Policy Paper Uri Saguy and Gilead Sher (2002)
Jewish Identity in Modern Israel: Proceedings on Secular Judaism and Democracy edited by Naftali Rothenberg and Eliezer Schweid (2002)
The Public Sphere in Muslim Societies edited by Miriam Hoexter, Shmuel N. Eisenstadt, Nehemia Levtzion (2002)
Lire Albert Memmi: Déracinement, Exil, Identité (2002)

Journals
The Van Leer institute publishes two peer-reviewed academic journals: Journal of Levantine Studies (2011–) and Contributions to the History of Concepts (since the early 1990s), both in English. From 2011 to 2020, it also published Identities: Journal of Jewish Culture and Identity, a Hebrew-language journal. The institute also publishes the Hebrew-language magazine Theory and Criticism (Hebrew)- The journal is very critical of Israel according to Ofira Seliktar.

See also
Culture of Israel

References

External links
 
 https://www.facebook.com/vanleer.institute
 https://twitter.com/VanleerInst
 https://www.youtube.com/user/VanleerInstitute
 The Van Leer Jerusalem Institute Official EN App.
 The Polonsky Academy
 Economics and Society
 The Gender Index
 Privatization

1959 establishments in Israel
Organizations established in 1959
Buildings and structures completed in 1959
Research institutes in Israel
Philosophy institutes
Buildings and structures in Jerusalem
Education in Jerusalem
Talbiya